El Playlist de Anoche (English: Last Night's Playlist) is the fifth studio album by Puerto Rican latin pop artist Tommy Torres, released on July 23, 2021. The album was co-written and co-produced by Torres and Bad Bunny.

Background
After releasing his last album 12 Historias in 2012, Tommy Torres spent the following years releasing singles both as a solo artist and featuring other artists such as Daddy Yankee, Sebastian Yatra, and Gaby Moreno. In early 2021, Torres signed with Rimas Entertainment after spending the last 11 years under Warner Music.

Signing with Rimas led to Torres collaborating with Bad Bunny, who expressed interest in writing songs with him, and both artists spent a couple of weeks in West Hollywood writing and producing what became the album.

Bad Bunny said via Rolling Stone, "I'm very proud of this album. I wanted to work in this record because making music is something that fills me."

Track listing

Charts

Weekly charts

Year-end charts

References

2021 albums
Latin pop albums by Puerto Rican artists